is a Buddhist temple in Minato, Tokyo, Japan.

Temple grounds

Buildings

Others

External links

 

Buddhist temples in Tokyo
Minato, Tokyo